Formose Mendy (born 2 January 2001) is a Senegalese professional footballer who plays as a defender for Amiens and the Senegal national team.

Career statistics

Club

Notes

References

External links
 

2001 births
Living people
People from Dakar
Footballers from Dakar
Senegalese footballers
Senegal international footballers
Senegal youth international footballers
Senegalese expatriate footballers
Association football defenders
Challenger Pro League players
Ligue 2 players
FC Porto players
Club Brugge KV players
Club NXT players
Amiens SC players
2022 FIFA World Cup players
Senegalese expatriate sportspeople in Portugal
Expatriate footballers in Portugal
Senegalese expatriate sportspeople in Belgium
Expatriate footballers in Belgium
Senegalese expatriate sportspeople in France
Expatriate footballers in France

Senegalese people of Bissau-Guinean descent